The Cleaning Lady (Spanish: La muchacha que limpia) is a Mexican crime drama television series co-produced by WarnerMedia Latin America and BTF Media. The series is based on the similarly named Argentina series La Chica Que Limpia, winner of the Martín Fierro Federal de Oro award. It consists of eight one-hour episodes of and was originally scheduled to premiere on TNT Latin America, but it was moved to HBO and premiered on June 20, 2021.

The series stars Damayanti Quintanar and revolves around Rosa, a servant who witnesses a crime, and to save her life and her freedom she decides to become complicit to the murderers.

Cast 

 Damayanti Quintanar as Rosa
 Gustavo Sánchez Parra as Correa

References

External links 

 

2020s Mexican drama television series
Spanish-language television shows
2021 Mexican television series debuts
Mexican crime television series